QuarkImmedia was an Internet and multimedia authoring and viewing application for Mac OS X and Windows, produced by Quark, Inc.  Designed for use in conjunction with either QuarkXPress or QuarkXPress Passport it was primarily used for CD-ROM publishing, although many online micros sites were published, one such online site was for the Spice Girls for the promotion of the band and their hits.

Hypertext
Multimedia software
Authoring systems